Matviy Bobal (born 27 May 1984) is a Ukrainian football forward for SC Tavriya Simferopol in the Ukrainian Premier League.

Career 
He has played for Zakarpattia Uzhhorod, CSKA Kyiv, Tavriya Simferopol, and FC Krymteplitsia Molodizhne in the past. He has been in Ihroservice since 2006.

Bobal was the top goalscorer in Ukrainian First League in the 2007–08 season with 23 goals (6 penalties) in 24 match appearances. He started off the 2008–09 season as top goalscorer of the first league by scoring a hat trick in the first match of the season.

On 8 January 2009 Bobal signed with Tavriya Simferopol after his outstanding performances in the Ukrainian First League placed him a head above every other goalscorer in the league.

Honours
Ukraine national team
 Football at the 2009 Summer Universiade – Champion

Ihroservis Simferopol
 2006–07 Ukrainian First League – Top scorer
 2007–08 Ukrainian First League – Top scorer

Notes

References

External links 
Profile on Official Website of Ihroservice

1984 births
Living people
Sportspeople from Uzhhorod
Ukrainian footballers
Ukraine student international footballers
Ukrainian footballers banned from domestic competitions
SC Tavriya Simferopol players
FC Hoverla Uzhhorod players
FC CSKA Kyiv players
FC Krymteplytsia Molodizhne players
FC Ihroservice Simferopol players
FC Dacia Chișinău players
MFC Mykolaiv players
FC Zhemchuzhyna Yalta players
Ukrainian expatriate footballers
Expatriate footballers in Moldova
Expatriate footballers in Slovakia
Ukrainian expatriate sportspeople in Moldova
Ukrainian expatriate sportspeople in Slovakia
4. Liga (Slovakia) players
Association football forwards
Crimean Premier League players
FC TSK Simferopol players
FC Bakhchisaray players
FC Mynai players
Universiade gold medalists for Ukraine
Universiade medalists in football
Medalists at the 2009 Summer Universiade